Events from the year 1968 in Pakistan.

Incumbents

Federal government
President: Ayub Khan
Chief Justice: 
 until 23 February: A.R. Cornelius
 1 March-3 June: S.A. Rahman
 4 June-17 November: Fazal Akbar
 starting 17 November: Hamoodur Rahman

Honours and awards
 Pakistan Hockey team led by Dr Tariq Aziz, won Gold at the Olympics in Men's Field Hockey

Births
 September 1 – Shahbaz Ahmad, field hockey player

Events 
 27 April – Ayub Khan inaugurated Kamalapur railway station in Dacca, East Pakistan (now Bangladesh).
 7 November – start of 1968 movement in Pakistan

See also
 1967 in Pakistan
 Other events of 1968
 1969 in Pakistan
 List of Pakistani films of 1968
 Timeline of Pakistani history

References

 
1968 in Asia